Prince Gabriel of Belgium (born 20 August 2003) is the elder son and second child of King Philippe and Queen Mathilde of Belgium. He is currently second in line to the throne of Belgium after his elder sister, Elisabeth.

Life
Prince Gabriel was born on 20 August 2003 in the Erasmus Hospital in Anderlecht, Brussels. He was christened at Ciergnon Castle, one of the royal family’s summer residences, on 25 October 2003. His godparents are his maternal uncle Count Charles-Henri d'Udekem d'Acoz; and his paternal second cousin, Baroness Maria Christina von . He was named after his great-uncle King Baudouin of Belgium, his maternal uncle and godfather Count Charles-Henri d'Udekem d'Acoz and Virgin Mary (traditional name in Catholic royalty).

Gabriel’s older sister, Elisabeth, precedes him in the line of succession following the 1991 adoption of absolute primogeniture. He also has a younger brother, Prince Emmanuel, and a younger sister, Princess Eléonore. He lives with his parents and siblings at the Royal Palace of Laeken.

Gabriel was a student at St John Berchmans College until 2019, where the instruction is in Dutch, in the Marolles district of Brussels, the capital of Belgium. He also speaks French and English. From 2019 to 2021, he finished his secondary education at the International School of Brussels (ISB), an English-language private school in Watermael-Boitsfort. From September 2021, he is taking a 1-year preparatory A-Level course in mathematics, further mathematics, and physics at The National Mathematics and Science College, a STEM-oriented sixth form college in Warwickshire, England. In August 2022, the Royal Family announced that Gabriel attended the Royal Military Academy of Belgium, studying social and military sciences in Dutch and will be a part of the 162nd class.

During the COVID-19 pandemic, Prince Gabriel had conversations over the phone with elderly people in residential care centers in order to encourage and support them. He has been involved in the Scouts since he was eight years old and has become a patrol leader in the last few years.

Prince Gabriel plays the piano. He likes to practice taekwondo, football,  cycling, tennis, swimming, skiing, sailing and hiking.

Arms

References

External links
Biography on the official website of the Belgian Royal Family

|-

2003 births
Living people
House of Belgium
People from Anderlecht
Princes of Saxe-Coburg and Gotha
Belgian people of Danish descent
Belgian people of German descent
Belgian people of Italian descent
Belgian people of Polish descent
Belgian people of Swedish descent
Sons of kings
Belgian male taekwondo practitioners